Bullard v. Blue Hills Bank, 575 U.S. 496 (2015), was a United States Supreme Court case in which the court held that an order from a bankruptcy court denying a debtor's confirmation of a proposed repayment cannot be immediately appealed, as it is not a final order. The decision, in favor of Blue Hills Bank, was unanimous.

See also
 List of United States Supreme Court cases
 Lists of United States Supreme Court cases by volume
 List of United States Supreme Court cases by the Roberts Court

References

External links
 

United States Supreme Court cases
United States Supreme Court cases of the Roberts Court
2015 in United States case law